The Greek Water Polo cup is the second most important competition of Greek men's waterpolo and is organised by KOE (Hellenic Swimming Federation). It was first held in 1953. Initially started as a competition in memory of Pantelis Psychas, Greek athlete of the swimming.  The competition was interrupted from 1959 to 1983. Moreover, it wasn't held in 1993-94 season. From 1998-99 season the Final Four system was instituted. Olympiacos Piraeus have won the most titles (24), followed by Ethnikos Piraeus (12). Olympiacos is the team with the most appearances in finals (30) while Ethnikos has the record of successive wins (8).

Title holders 

 1953  Ethnikos Piraeus
 1954  Ethnikos Piraeus
 1955  Ethnikos Piraeus
 1956  Ethnikos Piraeus
 1957  Ethnikos Piraeus
 1958  Ethnikos Piraeus
 1959–83 Not held
 1983–84  Ethnikos Piraeus
 1984–85  Ethnikos Piraeus
 1985–86  ANO Glyfada
 1986–87  ANO Glyfada
 1987–88  Ethnikos Piraeus
 1988–89  ANO Glyfada
 1989–90  NO Chios
 1990–91  Ethnikos Piraeus
 1991–92  Olympiacos
 1992–93  Olympiacos
 1993–94 Not held
 1994–95  NO Patras
 1995–96  NO Vouliagmeni
 1996–97  Olympiacos
 1997–98  Olympiacos
 1998–99  NO Vouliagmeni
 1999–00  Ethnikos Piraeus
 2000–01  Olympiacos
 2001–02  Olympiacos
 2002–03  Olympiacos
 2003–04  Olympiacos
 2004–05  Ethnikos Piraeus
 2005–06  Olympiacos
 2006–07  Olympiacos
 2007–08  Olympiacos
 2008–09  Olympiacos
 2009–10  Olympiacos
 2010–11  Olympiacos
 2011–12  NO Vouliagmeni
 2012–13  Olympiacos
 2013–14  Olympiacos
 2014–15  Olympiacos
 2015–16  Olympiacos
 2016–17  NO Vouliagmeni
 2017–18  Olympiacos
 2018–19  Olympiacos
 2019–20  Olympiacos
 2020–21  Olympiacos
 2021–22  Olympiacos
 2022–23  Olympiacos

Finals

Performance by club

References

External links
Hellenic Swimming Federation

Water polo competitions in Greece